Caladenia petrensis, commonly known as the rock spider orchid is a plant in the orchid family Orchidaceae and is endemic to the south-west of Western Australia. It has a single erect, hairy leaf and up to three pale yellow flowers with drooping lateral sepals and petals.

Description
Caladenia petrensis is a terrestrial, perennial, deciduous, herb with an underground tuber. It is sometimes found as a solitary plant or otherwise in small clumps. The flowers are cream-coloured to pale yellow with dark red lines and blotches. The sepals and petals are linear to lance-shaped near their base, then suddenly narrow to a dark brown, thread-like tip covered with glandular hairs. The tip of the labellum curves downwards and there are two rows of anvil-shaped calli along its centre. Flowering occurs from late July to September.

Taxonomy and naming
Caladenia petrensis was first formally described by Andrew Brown and Garry Brockman in 2007 from a specimen collected near Rothsay. The description was published in Nuytsia. The specific epithet (petrensis) is a Latin word meaning "among rocks" referring to the rocky habitat where this species grows.

Distribution and habitat
The rock spider orchid is found between Canna and Paynes Find in the Avon Wheatbelt, Geraldton Sandplains and Yalgoo biogeographic regions where it grows in seasonally moist soils on rocky hills.

Conservation
Caladenia petrensis is classified as "not threatened" by the Western Australian Government Department of Parks and Wildlife.

References

petrensis
Endemic orchids of Australia
Orchids of Western Australia
Plants described in 2007